Sangeeth Cooray (born 15 March 1995) is a Sri Lankan cricketer. He made his first-class debut for Saracens Sports Club in the 2015–16 Premier League Tournament on 4 December 2015.

In March 2018, he was named in Dambulla's squad for the 2017–18 Super Four Provincial Tournament. The following month, he was also named in Dambulla's squad for the 2018 Super Provincial One Day Tournament. In August 2021, he was named in the SLC Greys team for the 2021 SLC Invitational T20 League tournament. However, prior to the first match, he failed a fitness test.

References

External links
 

1995 births
Living people
Sri Lankan cricketers
Kilinochchi District cricketers
Moors Sports Club cricketers
Saracens Sports Club cricketers
Cricketers from Colombo